Jonah Ratsimbazafy is a Malagasy primatologist. In 2020, he was appointed President of the International Primatological Society.

Life and research 
Ratsimbazafy received his PhD from the State University of New York at Stony Brook in Physical Anthropology in 2002, and afterwards became Training and Conservation Coordinator for Durrell Wildlife Conservation Trust in Madagascar. He has published over 170 papers and supervised over 65 students, including 20 PhD students. His main field of study is lemur ecology and conservation.

Ratsimbazafy is Co-founder and President of the Madagascar Primate Study and Research Group (GERP), Houston Zoo's Director of Madagascar Programs, and Regional Vice-Chair of the IUCN SSC Primate Specialist Group for Madagascar. He is also one of the advisors of the Lemur Conservation Network and sits on the administrative board of SADABE, an NGO. In 2020, Ratsimbazafy was elected President of the International Primatological Society for a four-year term.

Honours and awards
In 2015, Ratsimbazafy was awarded Disney's Conservation Hero Award. In 2017, Ratsimbazafy was elected as a member of the African Academy of Sciences.

In 2020, a new species of mouse lemur, Microcebus jonahi, was named in honour to Jonah Ratsimbazafy.

Notes

References 
 Schüßler, D., Blanco, M. B., Salmona, J., Poelstra, J., Andriambeloson, J. B., Miller, A., ... & Radespiel, U. (2020). Ecology and morphology of mouse lemurs (Microcebus spp.) in a hotspot of microendemism in northeastern Madagascar, with the description of a new species. American Journal of Primatology, 82(9), e23180. https://onlinelibrary.wiley.com/doi/full/10.1002/ajp.23180
 Poelstra, J. W., Salmona, J., Tiley, G. P., Schüßler, D., Blanco, M. B., Andriambeloson, J. B., ... & Yoder, A. D. (2021). Cryptic patterns of speciation in cryptic primates: microendemic mouse lemurs and the multispecies coalescent. Systematic Biology, 70(2), 203-218. https://academic.oup.com/sysbio/article/70/2/203/5869053?login=true

Primatologists
Malagasy scientists
Year of birth missing (living people)
Living people
Stony Brook University alumni
Fellows of the African Academy of Sciences